Something to Believe In may refer to:

Music

Albums 
 Something to Believe In (Anna Bergendahl album), and the title song
 Something to Believe In (Curtis Mayfield album), and the title song

Songs 
 "Something to Believe In" (Clannad song)
 "Something to Believe In" (Fashawn song)
 "Something to Believe In" (Poison song)
 "Something to Believe In" (Ramones song)
 "Something to Believe In" (Young the Giant song)
 "Something to Believe In", a song by The Bangles from Everything
 "Something to Believe In", a song by Bon Jovi from These Days
 "Something to Believe In", a song by FM Static from What Are You Waiting For?
 "Something to Believe In", a song by Meghan Trainor from Only 17
 "Something to Believe In", a song by The Offspring from Smash
 "Something to Believe In", a song by Sarah Brightman from As I Came of Age
 "Something to Believe In", a song by Steve Miller Band from The Joker
 "Something to Believe In", a song by Van Hunt, Jon McLaughlin, and Jason Mraz from Randy Jackson's Music Club, Vol. 1
 "Something to Believe In", a song from the musical film Spectacular!
 "Something to Believe In (Jeremiah)", a song by Parachute from The Way It Was

Other uses 
 Something to Believe in: Is Kurt Vonnegut the Exorcist of Jesus Christ Superstar?, a book by Robert L. Short
 Something to Believe In (film), a 1998 film starring Tom Conti

See also 
 Something (disambiguation)